Misnomer Dance Theater is a modern dance company based in Brooklyn, New York. Founded in 1998 by Artistic Director and choreographer Chris Elam. In addition to producing and touring the choreographies of Chris Elam, Misnomer Dance Theater has launched signature programs that provide dance opportunities for artists.

History 

Founded in 1998 by Artistic Director and choreographer Chris Elam, Misnomer has performed, researched, and created new work in Cuba, Brazil, Indonesia, Ireland, the Netherlands, Ukraine, France, and Turkey, as well as throughout the United States. Based in New York City, the Company has performed locally at Dance Theater Workshop, the [Skirball Center], Symphony Space, Danspace Project, PS 122, Joyce Soho, and at the River-to-River Festival. Misnomer has also been named one of the top ten dance performances for 2006 by The New York Times and as one of the "25 to Watch" for 2007 by Dance Magazine, Misnomer was awarded year-long residencies from both The Joyce Theater and the [Skirball Center].

Residencies also have been received from the 92nd Street Y Harkness Dance Center, ORT, Dragon's Egg, New York University, Union Street Dance, and Brooklyn Arts Exchange. The Company has received commissions and fellowships from The Yard, Summer Stages Dance, the Baryshnikov Arts Center, [The American Music Center], New York State Council for the Arts, The Jerome Foundation, Lower Manhattan Cultural Council, Bates Dance Festival, The Portland Center for New Dance Development, and DanzAbierta in Cuba.   
Misnomer continues to partner with institutions locally and abroad in educational outreach. Past engagements include Brown University, Hofstra University, Harvard University, Summer Stages, and the State Conservatory for the Arts in Turkey.   Misnomer's aesthetic and extensive online work has led to collaborations and projects with Björk, Apple Computers, Business Week, and [Danish Dance Theater]. Musical collaborators who have set scores to dances by Misnomer include Andy Teirstein, Scott Killian, Mike Vargas, Jesse Manno, the Talujon Percussion Ensemble, and Evan Ziporyn.

Performances and Repertory  
Since Misnomer’s inception ten years ago, the company has performed in over 200 theaters across the globe.

Outreach  
Misnomer leads workshops, gives talks, and teaches extensively. Misnomer has been a guest choreographer at the University of Wisconsin, Brown University, Rhode Island College, Roger Williams College, Hofstra University, and Manhattanville College. 

Modern dance companies